Operation Warzone is a 1988 American Vietnam War film.

Plot summary
During the Vietnam War, three U.S. Army soldiers, Sgt. Holt, Butler and Adams, survive a Viet Cong ambush and rescue two undercover American agents, named Hawkins and Jensen, whom are seeking out a mysterious Intelligence agent, known only as 'the General' who has classified documents detailing an illegal arms deal between a corrupt general, named Delevane based in the Pentagon, whom is involved in an arms-for-profit deal with a corrupt U.S. Army officer back in Vietnam, named Colonel Harker, who sends troops, led by Corporal Stringer, to look for 'the General'. During this, Hawkins tells Holt that there will be an arms shipment to be made very soon which will go to the North Vietnamese for huge profit which will prolong the war for the military back home.

Hawkins and Holt are captured by another group of soldiers, led by a shady Australian named Lt. Smitty, who tries to find out which one of them is the General. Hawkins and Holt are later rescued by Stringer and his soldiers where after asking a coded number question, Hawkins is revealed to be the General. They are taken to Colonel Harker, whom asks for the documents of the arms shipment, and then orders Stringer to execute both of them. But Stringer is revealed to be a turncoat who is working with Butler, also an undercover agent, who wants to help stop the arms deal from happening which leads to Holt, Butler, Hawkins, Stringer, Smitty, Adams and Jensen to team up to launch an climatic attack against Harker's camp. During the battle, Smitty and all of Harker's men are killed, but Hawkins is fatally wounded by Harker before he is killed. However, before he dies, Hawkins gives Holt the location and code word to the location of the arms shipment and urges the squad to acquire and use it to win the war for the U.S. Army. The film ends with a news report about a major American military offensive into North Vietnam related to the arms shipment, and the distraught Delevane commits suicide before he is to be questioned about his involvement in the deal.

Cast
 Joe Spinell as Brigadier General George Delevane 
 Fritz Matthews as Sergeant Holt  
 William Zipp as Corporal Butler   
 John Cianetti as Specialist Sergeant Hawkins  
 David Marriott as Lieutenant Smitty  
 Sean Holton as Corporal Adams  
 Sonny King as Specialist Jenson  
 Chet Hood as Corporal Stringer
 David Roger Harris as Colonel Harker

References

External links

OperationWarZone on website

Vietnam War films
1988 films
1980s action war films
Films directed by David A. Prior
American action war films
1980s English-language films
1980s American films